Robert Richers (by 1524 – 1587/89)  (aliter Rychers, etc.), of Lincoln's Inn, London and Wrotham, Kent, was a lawyer who served as a Member of Parliament for Reigate in Kent in 1547, April 1554 and November 1554, and for Grampound in Cornwall in 1558.

Life
He was a son of Henry Richers of Swannington in Norfolk, of an old gentry family, by his wife Cecily Tills, a daughter of Robert Tills of Runhall in Norfolk. He studied law at Lincoln's Inn and was called to the bar in 1544. He died at some time before 12 Feb. 1589, when his will was proved.

Marriage and issue
At some time before November 1553 he married Elizabeth Cartwright, a daughter of Edmund Cartwright of Ossington in Nottinghamshire, by his wife Agnes Cranmer, a daughter of Thomas Cranmer of Sutton in Nottinghamshire, and the widow of Reginald Peckham (d.1551) of Yaldham in Kent. By his wife he had one son and five daughters including:
Mary Richers, who married Sir Robert Houghton (1548-1624), of Lincoln's Inn and Norwich, Norfolk, a Judge of the King's Bench and a Member of Parliament for Norwich in 1593, the third son of John Houghton of Gunthorpe, Norfolk, by his wife Agnes Playford, a daughter of Robert Playford of Brinton, Norfolk. Mary erected the surviving mural monument to her husband in St Mary's Church, Shelton, Norfolk, on which are shown her paternal arms of Richers: Argent, three annulets azure

References

1580s deaths
People from Wrotham
Members of Lincoln's Inn
Year of birth uncertain
English MPs 1547–1552
English MPs 1554
English MPs 1554–1555
English MPs 1558
16th-century births